Margarethe Loewe-Bethe (1859-1932) was a German painter.

Biography
Loewe-Bethe née Loewe was born in 1859 in the Province of Silesia. She was married to Erich Bethe (1863-1940). Loewe-Bethe exhibited her work at the Woman's Building at the 1893 World's Columbian Exposition in Chicago, Illinois.

Loewe-Bethe died in 1932 in Leipzig.

The spellings of the artist's name include Margarethe Loewe-Bethe, Margarethe Löewe and Margarethe Bethe-Löwe, Margarete Loewe, and Margarethe Bethe.

References

External links
  
 images of Loewe-Bethe 's work on ArtNet

1859 births
1932 deaths
German women painters
19th-century German women artists
20th-century German women artists
19th-century German painters
20th-century German painters